30 Gallon Tank is the third EP by the indie rock band Spoon. The 7" record was released on May 5, 1998, as a promotional EP showcasing the band which was newly signed to Elektra Records. The A-side of 30 Gallon Tank contained two tracks that also appeared on A Series of Sneaks, while the B-side contained a new Spoon song and a previously released Drake Tungsten track.

Track listing

Notes
 The title track "30 Gallon Tank" was also released on A Series of Sneaks.
 The song "Car Radio (Different)" is a remix of the similarly named track that appears on A Series of Sneaks.
 "Revenge!" is a never-before released Spoon track.
 "I Could Be Underground" is originally a Drake Tungsten song, with slightly different versions appearing on Clocking Out Is For Suckers and Six Pence for the Sauces.

Personnel 
Britt Daniel – lead vocals, guitar
Eric Harvey – keyboard, guitar, vocals
Joshua Zarbo – bass guitar
Jim Eno – drums

References

External links
 Spoon's official website

1998 EPs
Spoon (band) albums
Elektra Records EPs